Armand Samuel de Marescot, born in Tours on 1 March 1758, died 5 November 1832 at Castle Chaslay near Montoire Loir-et-Cher was a French general of engineering in the French Revolutionary Wars and the Napoleonic Wars. MARESCOT is one of the names inscribed under the Arc de Triomphe, on Column 14.

Career 
In Germany in 1796, he was the commander of Landau on 16 April. He repelled an attack in October 1796 by Friedrich Freiherr von Hotze, then later defended the fortifications of Kehl until its surrender in early 1797.

Subsequently, he was appointed Commander in Chief of Engineering of the Rhine Army, he served at the crossing of the Rhine River at Kehl until 20 April 1797. He was then successively appointed commander of Army engineering in Germany, the commander of engineers in the Army of the Danube 7 March 1799, and then commander of Army engineers of the joint Army of Helvetia and the Army of the Danube under Andre Massena on 30 April 1799. He served in the Swiss campaign until the peace of 1801, and later in the War of the Third Coalition.  Subsequently, he fought in the Peninsular War.

He died at Vendome on 25 December 1832 and his name is on the east side of the Arc de Triomphe.

1758 births
1832 deaths
Engineers from Tours, France
French marquesses
Counts of the First French Empire
Members of the Chamber of Peers of the Bourbon Restoration
French generals
French Republican military leaders of the French Revolutionary Wars
French military personnel of the Napoleonic Wars
Names inscribed under the Arc de Triomphe
Military personnel from Tours, France